The Neagra is a right tributary of the river Bistrița in Romania. It discharges into the Bistrița in Dorna-Arini near Vatra Dornei.

Tributaries

The following rivers are tributaries to the river Neagra (from source to mouth):

Left: Neagra Șarului, Pinul, Pârâul Feții, Hagiul, Biserica, Haita, Pârâul cu Pește, Runcu, Sărișorul Mare, Borcutul
Right: Calul, Zăpodea, Granița, Bâuca, Tăieturii, Călimănel, Pârâul Rusului

References

Rivers of Romania
Rivers of Suceava County